District 32B is a district of the Minnesota House of Representatives covering Wyoming, Lindström, Center City, and portions of the city of North Branch. It is currently represented by Republican Anne Neu who was first elected in a 2017 special election.

In the Senate, the same area comprises part of Minnesota Senate, District 32.

List of members representing the district

Historical district boundaries

References

Minnesota House of Representatives districts
Chisago County, Minnesota